Wicker is a hard fibre often used in the construction of baskets and furniture.

Wicker may also refer to:

 Wicker (surname), a surname
 Wicker (Sheffield), a street in Sheffield, England 
 Wicker (novel), 2005 novel by Kevin Guilfoile, also published as Cast of Shadows
 Wicker, Texas, a ghost town in Texas

See also 
Wicker man (disambiguation)
Whicker, a surname
Wickr, an encrypted messaging app